The Concerto for Wind Ensemble is a concerto for wind ensemble by the Czech-born American composer Karel Husa.  It was written for the Michigan State University Wind Ensemble in 1982 and won the first Sudler International Composition Prize in 1983.

Reception
Classical Music: The Listener's Companion compared the work favorably to Béla Bartók's Concerto for Orchestra and praised the work for "...show[ing] a lightness of texture that allows the exposure of everyone's talents."  Author Frank L. Battisti also lauded the work, saying:

References

Compositions by Karel Husa
1982 compositions
Husa
20th-century classical music